Hendrik Abbé was a Flemish painter, engraver and architect.

Life
Abbé was baptized in 1639 in the cathedral at Antwerp. Some prints by him were published in Antwerp in 1670. An edition of Ovid's Metamorpheses, published by  Francois Foppens in Brussels in 1677, was partly illustrated with plates by other engravers after drawings by Abbé.

References

Sources

External links
 

1639 births
Year of death unknown
Artists from Antwerp
17th-century Flemish painters
Flemish engravers
17th-century engravers